Teah Baysah Dennis (born 5 July 1992) is a Liberian professional footballer who plays as a defender and most recently played for I-League side Punjab FC.

Background
Teah Dennis Jr., born in Liberia, began his playing career with LPRC Oilers FC in Monrovia. He was then transferred to one of the country's biggest clubs, Barrack Young Controllers Football Club, where he established himself as a key player. 

After several seasons with Barrack Young Controllers, Dennis moved to Jordanian club Al-Ahli in 2014 on a two-year loan deal. On 1 July 2016, he again went on loan deal, this time to Malaysian outfit Sarawak. After permanently moving back to Al-Ahli in 2017, he transferred to rival Jordanian club Al-Hussein the following year before eventually landing at Indian club Punjab F.C. at the beginning of the 2019 season. He also played for Calcutta Football League side Southern Samity.

Honors

Barrack Young Controllers
 Liberian Premier League: 2013, 2014
 Liberian Cup: 2013

Al-Ahli
 Jordan FA Cup: 2015–16

Liberia
 WAFU Nations Cup: 3rd place 2011

Career statistics

International goals
Scores and results list Liberia's goal tally first.

References

External links
 

Association football midfielders
1992 births
Living people
Liberia international footballers
Expatriate footballers in Malaysia
Expatriate footballers in Jordan
Liberian footballers
Al-Hussein SC (Irbid) players
Al-Ahli SC (Amman) players
Liberian expatriate footballers
Liberian expatriate sportspeople in Malaysia
Association football forwards
Sportspeople from Monrovia
Liberian expatriate sportspeople in India
Expatriate footballers in India